Castleford railway station serves the town of Castleford in West Yorkshire.

Although it was built originally as a through station, regular passenger services beyond Castleford towards York were discontinued in January 1970.  Today, all trains calling at the station reverse here, arriving and departing from the former northbound platform 1. Platform 2 is currently out of use and inaccessible, though it was brought back into use temporarily during the Leeds First project in 2002; Transpennine services between York and Huddersfield were diverted to avoid engineering work in Leeds, routed via Church Fenton, Castleford and Wakefield Kirkgate.  It is due to brought back into use on a more permanent basis to help accommodate extra services in 2023 as part of the Transpennine Route Upgrade project. The route from Church Fenton continues to be used for freight traffic, empty stock transfers, special trains and such engineering and other out-of-course diversions as required as well as a small number of passenger trains that are booked this way for route retention; this includes overnight Trans-Pennine services, plus the first Cross Country from York on Saturdays.

In February 2016, West Yorkshire Metro opened a new Castleford bus station next to the railway station, featuring a fully integrated and staffed transport interchange. Work on the new £6 million bus station was started in October 2014.

History

The current station was built by the North Eastern Railway in 1871 to replace an earlier one  to the east built by the York and North Midland Railway on their line from York to Normanton and opened on 1 July 1840.  A short time later an east to north curve was constructed between Whitwood and Methley junctions (the latter on the North Midland Railway main line) to create the first through route between York and Leeds – it would remain the primary route between the two cities until 1869 and also carry services between Leeds and Hull for a number of years thanks to the machinations of George Hudson.

The town gained a second station at Cutsyke in 1860, courtesy of the Lancashire and Yorkshire Railway whose line from Pontefract Monkhill to Methley Junction (and hence Leeds) had opened in 1849 and passed over the Y&NMR line near Whitwood Junction.  Further construction work by both companies saw lines built to Lofthouse (on the main line from Wakefield Westgate to Leeds) via Stanley (the Methley Joint line) in 1865 (1 May 1869 for passenger traffic), to Garforth via Ledston in 1878 (giving passengers the choice of no fewer than three alternative routes to Leeds) and a curve linking the Y&NM and L&Y routes in the town two years later.  This latter piece of line was seldom used for much of its life (and was closed on two occasions) but now forms an important part of the line towards Knottingley.

Thus by the end of the nineteenth century the station (by now known as Castleford Central) had an impressive range of services to choose from, with regular links to Leeds, Wakefield and on towards Manchester Victoria through the Calder Valley as well as to York.  Longer distance destinations (including Sheffield, Derby, Birmingham and London) were also available by means of a change at Normanton.

By the early 1950s however the local network began to decline, with the Garforth line the first to lose its passenger trains on 22 January 1951.  The Methley Joint line fell victim to the Beeching Axe on 2 November 1964 whilst the L&Y station at Cutsyke suffered a similar fate on 7 October 1968 – trains from Pontefract thereafter using the aforementioned curve to reach Central, where they reversed before continuing to Leeds via Whitwood Junction (although the direct line remained in use for freight until 23 February 1981).

Another significant change was the withdrawal of services on the original Y&NMR line between York and Wakefield on 5 January 1970, leaving the station to be served only by trains on the Pontefract Line (although a handful of summer dated trains from Wakefield to York and Scarborough continued to run until 1988) and creating the current situation where all scheduled trains calling there approach from the west, use a single platform and have to reverse to continue their journeys.  One more positive development was the re-routing of trains on the Hallam line via the town in 1988, which reinstated the link with Wakefield and also gave passengers access to direct trains to Barnsley and Sheffield.

The station had substantial buildings on both platforms until the 1970s, but these have mostly been demolished (along with the footbridge); one structure still survives at the northern end of the remaining platform but it is not in passenger use. The old station signal box also remains, though it too is boarded up and disused (the area is now signalled from a panel box located next to the Castleford Gates level crossing).

A redevelopment of the station took place in 2020 with the construction of new station buildings and an enlarged car park. In November 2021, work began to restore the second platform. A new footbridge with lifts will be built to enable step-free access. The new footbridge was installed in October 2022 and will be opened in the spring of 2023.

Facilities

The station is unstaffed, though the Metro travel centre within the nearby bus station is staffed from 08:30 each day until 16:00 on weekdays and 14:30 on Saturdays (closed Sundays); this sells a full range of rail tickets. A self-service ticket machine is provided for use outside of these times and for collecting pre-paid tickets.  A waiting room is available on the platform, along with a digital information screen and timetable poster board; automated train announcements also offer running information for passengers.  Step-free access is available from the car park to the platform.  As of the completion of the new station buildings there is a takeaway food counter in the waiting room and a disabled toilet.

Services

Monday to Saturdays, there is a twice an hour service from Castleford to Leeds with an hourly service to Sheffield via Barnsley (Hallam Line) and an hourly service to Knottingley (plus one single early evening service through to Goole) (Pontefract Line). On Sundays there is an hourly service to Leeds and a two-hourly service to both Sheffield and Knottingley (but no service to Huddersfield).

Notes

References

Body, G. (1988), PSL Field Guides – Railways of the Eastern Region Volume 2, Patrick Stephens Ltd, Wellingborough,

External links

 Information from Metro about the new travel interchange

Railway stations in Wakefield
DfT Category F1 stations
Former York and North Midland Railway stations
Railway stations in Great Britain opened in 1840
Railway stations in Great Britain closed in 1871
Railway stations in Great Britain opened in 1871
Northern franchise railway stations
Castleford
George Townsend Andrews railway stations
1871 disestablishments in England